The 2011 Tippeligaen was the 67th completed season of top division football in Norway. The competition began on 20 March 2011 and ended on 27 November 2011. Rosenborg were the defending champions, having secured their twenty-second League Championship on 24 October 2010. Sogndal, Sarpsborg 08 and Fredrikstad entered as the three promoted teams from the 2010 1. divisjon. They replaced Hønefoss, Kongsvinger and Sandefjord who were relegated to the 2011 1. divisjon.

Molde won their first ever Eliteserien title with two games to spare. Molde's 58 points was a record low for an Eliteserien champion in the current 16-team system. 

The fastest goal in Norwegian top division history was scored this season on 15 April by Erik Mjelde in a 3–3 draw between his side Brann and Haugesund after 11 seconds.

Overview
At the end of the season, Sarpsborg 08 and Start were relegated to the 2012 1. divisjon, due to having finished in the bottom two positions in the standings. There was no two-legged promotion play-offs this season.

On 30 October 2011, Molde became champions with two games to spare after their only remaining challenger, Rosenborg, lost 3–6 to Brann in the 28th round of the series. The trophy was their first ever league championship.

Teams
Sixteen teams competed in the league – the top thirteen teams from the previous season, and the three teams promoted from 1. divisjon. The promoted teams were Sogndal, Sarpsborg 08 and Fredrikstad. This was Sarpsborg 08's first top-flight season, while Sogndal and Fredrikstad returned to the top flight after an absence of six years and one season respectively. They replaced Hønefoss (returning after their debut season in the first tier), Kongsvinger (relegated after a season's presence) and Sandefjord (relegated after two years in the top flight).

Stadiums and locations

''Note: Table lists in alphabetical order.

Managerial changes

League table

Positions by round

Results

Season statistics

Top scorers

†Veigar Páll Gunnarsson scored nine goals in sixteen games for Stabæk.

Source: Alt om fotball

Top assists

†Veigar Páll Gunnarsson assisted five goals in sixteen games for Stabæk.

††Jo Nymo Matland assisted three goals in seventeen games for Sarpsborg 08.

Source: Alt om fotball

Discipline

Player
Most yellow cards: 10
 Fegor Ogude (Vålerenga)
Most red cards: 1
21 players

Club
Most yellow cards: 59
Vålerenga

Most red cards: 4
Fredrikstad
Lillestrøm

Attendances

Awards

Annual awards

Goalkeeper of the Year 
The Goalkeeper of the Year awarded to  Espen Bugge Pettersen (Molde)

Defender of the Year 
The Defender of the Year awarded to  Even Hovland (Sogndal)

Midfielder of the Year 
The Midfielder of the Year awarded to  Michael Barrantes (Aalesunds)

Striker of the Year 

The Striker of the Year awarded to  Nikola Đurđić (Haugesund)

Coach of the Year 

The Coach of the Year awarded to  Ole Gunnar Solskjær (Molde)

See also 
 2011 in Norwegian football
 2011 1. divisjon
 2011 2. divisjon

References 

Eliteserien seasons
1
Norway
Norway